The Fate of the Dolphin is a 1916 American silent short drama film directed by Thomas Ricketts starring Perry Banks, Ed Coxen, George Field, Lizette Thorne, and Harry Van Meter.

External links

1916 films
1916 drama films
Silent American drama films
American silent short films
American black-and-white films
1916 short films
Films directed by Tom Ricketts
1910s American films
1910s English-language films